Zigrasimeciinae is a subfamily of ants, known from the Cretaceous period, originally named as the tribe Zigrasimeciini within the subfamily Sphecomyrminae by Borysenko, 2017, it was elevated to full subfamily in 2020. It contains three described genera. They are sometimes known as "iron-maiden ants" in reference to their densely spiked mouthparts, reminiscent of an iron maiden torture device, that were likely used to trap prey. Boltonimecia canadensis was described from Campanian Canadian amber out of Alberta, Canada, while the species of Protozigrasimecia and Zigrasimecia are both exclusively known from Cenomanian Burmese amber found in Myanmar.

Genera and species 
 Boltonimecia 
 B. canadensis  
Protozigrasimecia 
 P. chauli  
 Zigrasimecia 
 Z. ferox  
 Z. goldingot 
 Z. hoelldobleri  
 Z. tonsora

References 

Ants
Ant subfamilies